Torpedo Stadium is a multi-purpose stadium in Mogilev, Belarus. It is mostly used for football matches and is a home stadium for Torpedo Mogilev.  The stadium holds 3,560 spectators.

History
The stadium was built and opened in 1960. Renovation works were performed in 1978 and 2005. At present day the stadium is a part of bigger Torpedo Sport Complex which includes facilities for other sports as well.

Between 2006 and 2008 the stadium was a home ground for Savit Mogilev.

References

External links
Stadium page at Torpedo Mogilev website 

Football venues in Belarus
Sports venues in Mogilev
Buildings and structures in Mogilev Region